Borjas Martín González (born 28 June 1987) is a Spanish professional footballer who plays as a striker.

Club career
Borjas was born in Puerto de Tazacorte, Tenerife, Canary Islands. After finishing his training with UD Los Llanos de Aridane, he made his senior debut in the 2005–06 season with UD Tijarafe in the regional leagues.

Borjas subsequently represented CD Victoria, CD Mensajero (two stints), Tijarafe and UD Barbastro in Tercera División, before joining the Segunda División B side Atlético Astorga FC in July 2014. On 23 July the following year, after scoring 13 goals for Astorga, he signed for the fellow league team Pontevedra CF.

Borjas finished the season as Pontevedra's top goalscorer, and moved Real Murcia, still in the third division, on 21 June 2016. The following 13 January, he agreed to a contract with the fellow league team CE Sabadell FC.

On 31 July 2017, Borjas ended his contract with Sabadell, and announced two days later on his Twitter account that he had signed for the Finnish club FC Honka.

References

External links

1987 births
Living people
People from Tenerife
Sportspeople from the Province of Santa Cruz de Tenerife
Spanish footballers
Footballers from the Canary Islands
Association football forwards
Segunda División B players
Tercera División players
Divisiones Regionales de Fútbol players
UD Tijarafe players
CD Mensajero players
UD Barbastro players
Atlético Astorga FC players
Pontevedra CF footballers
Real Murcia players
CE Sabadell FC footballers
Veikkausliiga players
Ykkönen players
FC Honka players
Spanish expatriate footballers
Spanish expatriate sportspeople in Finland
Expatriate footballers in Finland
CD Victoria players